Kota Ezawa (born 1969, Cologne, West Germany) is a Japanese-German American artist and arts educator. His artwork usually responds to current events from sources in the news, pop culture, and art history. Ever since his debut 2002 video animation of The Simpson Verdict, Ezawa has been known for his flattened style in works on paper, light-boxes, and videos. By flattening his pieces into more two-dimensional figures, he creates more focus on the re-contextualized historical events in his pieces.

Originally from Germany, he moved to San Francisco in 1994 and is currently based in the San Francisco Bay Area.

Biography 
Ezawa grew up in Mössingen, outside Tübingen, West Germany; his father, Kennosuke Ezawa, was Japanese and a professor of Germanistik at the University of Tübingen. He attended Kunstakademie Düsseldorf from 1990 until 1994 and studied with Nan Hoover and Nam June Paik. He moved in 1994 to San Francisco, California. He graduated with a Bachelor of Fine Arts in 1995 from San Francisco Art Institute (SFAI). In 2003 he received his Master of Fine Arts degree from Stanford University.

Since 2000, Ezawa has produced his own abstracted computer animations. His work often juxtaposes seemingly contrary videos, politics, and celebrity recounting historical events, reminding the viewer that history is seen through an interpretative lens.

In 2005 he received the Artadia Award. In 2006, Ezawa received a SECA Art Award.

He is an Associate Professor of Film and Fine Arts at California College of the Arts (CCA).

Kota Ezawa has exhibited his work in solo exhibitions at Chrysler Museum of Art (2015), Yerba Buena Center for the Arts (2013), Wexner Center for the Arts (2009), St. Louis Art Museum, Artpace (2006), the Wadsworth Atheneum and many others.

Work 

 Simpson Verdict (2002): Ezawa took three years to create the 3 minute animation of the O.J. Simpson’s verdict. The animation reduces the international event to an exaggerated, simple cartoon. This work is in the Museum of Modern Art (MoMA) permanent collection.
The History of Photography Remix (2004–2006) This project explored how photographs act as a reflection of reality and how they can distort memories of people and events. Ezawa used photographs from art history textbooks for his sources of photography and with these photographs he reproduced them into his minimalistic and flattened style. This effect equalized all of the photographs so that they all read as similar images to the human eye instead of individual content.
 Lennon, Sontag, Beuys (2004): Animation portrays three politically active artists, Lennon, Sontag, and Beuys. This video sheds light on each artist stating their social and political platforms. 
 The Unbearable Lightness of Being (2005): Animation about the assassinations of Abraham Lincoln and John F. Kennedy produced with old news footage and with the 1915 film Birth of a Nation. The name of the film is taken from a book of the same title by Milan Kundera.
 LYAM 3D (2008): A silent, colored, and four minute animation that gives new meaning to Alain Resnais′ 1960s French New Wave film, L'Année dernière à Marienbad (Last Year at Marienbad). Ezawa used many sources like the news media and popular cinema to create a video with his flattened style that only kept essential shapes.
 Choco Drink TV (2012): Sculpture of a mechanical television made from found objects such as wooden spoons and a Nesquik can, the images on the screen are of Kota's work. Channels can be changed by moving the wooden spoon.
National Anthem (2018): Watercolor animation was installed at the 2019 Whitney Biennial. The animated art piece addressees police brutality and racism. The inspiration behind this piece is the event where the San Francisco 49ers football player, Colin Kaepernick, took a knee during the National Anthem in protest of police officers being violent towards black men who are unarmed.

References

External links 
 Kota Ezawa collection at San Francisco Museum of Modern Art (SFMoMA)
Kota Ezawa collection at Smithsonian Institution

1969 births
German emigrants to the United States
People from San Francisco
San Francisco Art Institute alumni
Stanford University alumni
Artists from San Francisco
California College of the Arts faculty
German people of Japanese descent
Living people